Frederick James Aldridge (1850–1933) was a British painter in oils and watercolourist, known for painting marine scenes.

He was born in 1850, he did not take up painting until he was twenty years old. He lived and worked in Worthing, where he had a gallery shop.  He signed his works 'F J Aldridge'.

He attended Cowes Week many times over a period of around fifty-years.
Three of his works were exhibited at the Royal Academy and twelve at the Suffolk Street Galleries. His painting of the harbour at Littlehampton is in the collection of Littlehampton Museum.

Failing eyesight forced him to stop painting in 1927. He died in 1933, aged 83.

References

External links 

1850 births
1933 deaths
People from Worthing
British watercolourists